Santa Rosa Canton is a canton of Ecuador, located in the El Oro Province.  Its capital is the town of Santa Rosa.  Its population at the 2001 census was 60,388.

Demographics
Ethnic groups as of the Ecuadorian census of 2010:
Mestizo  83.6%
Afro-Ecuadorian  7.2%
White  6.6%
Montubio  1.7%
Indigenous  0.6%
Other  0.3%

References

Cantons of El Oro Province